Thomas Richard Martin (January 30, 1922 – May 24, 2008), known professionally as Dick Martin, was an American comedian and director. He was known for his role as the co-host of the sketch comedy program Rowan & Martin's Laugh-In from 1968 to 1973.

Early life and career

Martin was born in Battle Creek, Michigan, to William, a salesman, and Ethel Martin, a homemaker. In the early 1930s, the family moved to Detroit, where his teenage years included a bout with tuberculosis, which kept him out of the military.

Early in his career, Martin was a staff writer for Duffy's Tavern, a radio situation comedy. He and Dan Rowan formed the comedy team Rowan and Martin in 1952 and played in nightclubs throughout the United States and overseas. Martin played a drunk heckling a Shakespearean performer, a mainstay of their act for years. They could frequently be seen as host-performers on NBC's Colgate Comedy Hour, alternating with Dean Martin and Jerry Lewis and other more established names. In 1958, they starred in Hal Kanter's comedy Western Once Upon a Horse..., which was a box office failure. In 1960, they asked NBC to cancel their contract four years early and the network agreed.

In 1962, Martin worked solo, playing the next-door neighbor to Lucille Ball during the first season of her comeback comedy The Lucy Show. He and Rowan returned to the nightclub circuit until 1966, when they were asked to host the summer replacement series for The Dean Martin Show. He co-starred in the 1966 Doris Day movie The Glass Bottom Boat.

Laugh-In
The exposure led to an opportunity for Rowan and Martin to team up with producers Ed Friendly and George Schlatter and create Rowan & Martin's Laugh-In (1968–1973) on NBC. The comedy show was an immediate hit, becoming the number one American television program within two months of its debut. It was the top-rated show in its second and third seasons. Laugh-In had a uniquely fast-paced stream-of-consciousness style of blackout gags, double entendre, topical satire, and catchphrases, much of it delivered by a cast of then-unknowns such as Goldie Hawn, Lily Tomlin, Arte Johnson, and Ruth Buzzi.

At the center of the maelstrom stood the veterans Rowan and Martin, who bemusedly made no effort to slow down the program. Martin later said, "We designed it so that we are two relatively normal guys wandering through a sea of madness," and described his comic persona as "a kind of inept lech" who could be laughed at as well as laughed with. In real life, Martin spent the 1960s enjoying his high-flying lifestyle of women and parties. At the height of the show's popularity, Rowan and Martin starred in the 1969 film The Maltese Bippy, which was a notorious failure. After Rowan retired from show business, Martin was a frequent panelist on game shows such as Match Game, Password Plus, and Tattletales, and he also hosted a parody game show called The Cheap Show in 1978, and the game show Mindreaders in 1979.

Later career
Martin also established himself as a comedy director. Starting on The Bob Newhart Show, he directed episodes of more than twenty different TV comedy series. Martin later became the chief director of the 1980s sitcom Newhart. He continued his relationship with Bob Newhart on the latter's short-lived series Bob on CBS (1992–93), where he portrayed Buzz Loudermilk and directed several of the series' episodes.

In 1991, Martin guest-starred in a two episode role on Coach as Peter Plunkett, a childhood friend of Luther VanDam. In a 1998 episode of The Nanny, Martin guest-starred as a homeless man Fran Fine meets in a park who turns out to be Preston Collier, one of the wealthiest men in New York City.

In 1992, he played a small role in the Canadian film North of Pittsburgh, which was directed by his son Richard. In 1996, Martin guest starred as sociology professor Dr. Ben Littmeyer on 3rd Rock from the Sun.

In 1997, he guest-starred in an episode of Baywatch. He played an old World War II sailor named Ed who was trying to give a buddy a proper burial.

Personal life
Martin married singer Peggy Connelly in 1957. They divorced prior to 1968 and he married Playboy Playmate and Beyond the Valley of the Dolls star Dolly Read in 1971. Martin and Read divorced in June 1974, but remarried in 1978 and remained married until his death. His son Richard Martin is a television director, film director and film editor.

Death
Martin died on May 24, 2008, of breathing complications in Santa Monica, California. He had lost the use of a lung due to tuberculosis as a teenager and suffered respiratory problems late in life.

Filmography

References

External links

1922 births
2008 deaths
American male comedians
American male television actors
American male screenwriters
American sketch comedians
American television directors
American game show hosts
Deaths from respiratory failure
Male actors from Michigan
Michigan State University alumni
People from Battle Creek, Michigan
20th-century American male actors
Screenwriters from Michigan
20th-century American comedians
20th-century American male writers
20th-century American screenwriters